Stefan Guy Ratchford (born 19 July 1988) is an English rugby league footballer who plays as a  for the Warrington Wolves in the Betfred Super League and the England Knights and England international at international level. 

He previously played for the Salford City Reds between 2007 and 2011 in the Super League and National League One.

Background
Stefan Ratchford was born in Wigan, Greater Manchester, England. 

He started playing rugby league at the age of six, initially playing junior rugby for Wigan St Cuthberts before later switching to Wigan St Patricks.

Playing career
Ratchford signed with Salford City Reds in 2005, and made his first team début for the club in 2007 in a fourth round Challenge Cup match against Gateshead Thunder. 

In 2008, following the club's relegation to National League One, Ratchford established himself as a regular first team player. He formed an effective halfback partnership alongside Richie Myler, helping the team win the Northern Rail Cup, and the Division One Grand Final.  
Ratchford played in the 2012 Challenge Cup Final victory over Leeds at Wembley Stadium.

Ratchford played in the 2012 Super League Grand Final defeat by Leeds at Old Trafford.

Ratchford played in the 2013 Super League Grand Final defeat by Wigan at Old Trafford.

Ratchford signed a new deal in 2014 keeping him at the Warrington club until 2018.

Ratchford played in the 2016 Super League Grand Final defeat by Wigan at Old Trafford.

Ratchford played in the 2018 Challenge Cup Final defeat by the Catalans Dragons at Wembley Stadium.
During Warrington's defeat by Wigan in the 2018 Super League Grand Final Ratchford was voted winner of the Harry Sunderland Trophy making him only the fourth recipient of the award to have played for the losing side.

Ratchford played in the 2018 Super League Grand Final defeat by Wigan at Old Trafford.

Ratchford played in the 2019 Challenge Cup Final victory over St. Helens at Wembley Stadium.
In round 8 of the 2021 Super League season, he scored a try and kicked 11 goals in Warrington's 62-18 victory over Salford.

International career
Ratchford was named in the England squad for 2009 Four Nations, but did not appear in any games during the tournament. At the end of the 2011 season, Ratchford rejected a new contract offer from Salford and joined Warrington Wolves. He also made two appearances for the England Knights in 2011 and 2012.

In October 2017 he was selected in the England squad for the 2017 Rugby League World Cup.

Honours
 Challenge Cup: 2

2012 2019
 
 League Leaders' Shield: 1
2016

Personal life
In 2015, Ratchford set up a business with former Salford City Reds team mate Matty Smith called Future Stars, which runs coaching sessions for junior rugby league players.

References

External links

Warrington Wolves profile
(archived by web.archive.org) Statistics at rlwc2017.com
SL profile

1988 births
Living people
England national rugby league team players
England Knights national rugby league team players
English rugby league players
Rugby league five-eighths
Rugby league fullbacks
Rugby league players from Wigan
Salford Red Devils players
Warrington Wolves captains
Warrington Wolves players